Tremaine is a Cornish language name, though, most often a surname.

Surname
F. Orlin Tremaine, science fiction editor
Emily Hall Tremaine, art director and collector
Jeff Tremaine, film and television producer
Marilyn Tremaine, computer scientist
Morris S. Tremaine, NYS Comptroller (1927–1941)
Scott Tremaine, astrophysicist

Given name
Tremaine Edmunds, American football player
Tremaine Fowlkes, basketball player
Trey Songz, was born Tremaine Aldon Neverson

Fictional people
Lady Tremaine, character in the 1950 film Cinderella
Nancy Tremaine, a character in the 2007 Disney film Enchanted
Prescott Tremaine, character from David Weber's "Honorverse" series of novels
Tremaine Gidigbi, character from the television series Footballers' Wives
Lord Robert Tremaine of Barham, character from the novel "The Masqueraders" by Georgette Heyer

See also

Tremaine, Cornwall, village in the United Kingdom
3806 Tremaine, asteroid
Davis Wright Tremaine, law firm
Tremain (disambiguation)
Tremayne (disambiguation)

Cornish-language surnames